The 2021 season for the  team was the team's 10th season in existence, all of which have been as a UCI WorldTeam. 

Ahead of the season, Scott Sports, one of the co-title sponsors from the previous season, was dropped as the team switched to Bianchi Bicycles, though Bianchi did not become a title sponsor. Additionally, Mitchelton Wines, a brand owned by team owner Gerry Ryan, was also dropped from co-title sponsor after three years. It was replaced by Australian cycling retailer BikeExchange, another Ryan brand which had previously been co-title sponsor for the 2016 season and which became the sole title sponsor.

Team roster 

Riders who joined the team for the 2021 season

Riders who left the team during or after the 2020 season

Season victories

National, Continental, and World Champions

References

External links 
 

Team BikeExchange (men's team)
2021
Team BikeExchange (men's team)